is a Japanese musician. His most recent album is 2016's Wild Lips.

Kōji was born in Hiroshima and his music career began on February 1, 1984, with "Monica" (later remade in Cantonese sung by Leslie Cheung) and he won eight music awards in the same year. After taking a short break in 1988, he came back as a lead singer in the band Complex with Tomoyasu Hotei (former guitarist of Boøwy) and "Be My Baby" was released. Complex remained as one of the most popular bands in Japan until 1990, when it was announced that Complex had disbanded.

After "Complex", Kōji released series of hit singles such as "Setsunasa O Korosenai",  "Kiss Ni Utarete Nemuritai" and "Boy's Life". Kōji completed a "20th Anniversary Tour" at Budokan on February 1, 2005.

In 2006 he recorded "One World," the theme for the 2006 motion picture Kamen Rider Kabuto: God Speed Love. More recently, he had teamed up with popular Japanese DJ TWINS to release a single "Juicy Jungle". Also, DJ TWINS had released an album with remixes of several of Kōji's previous hits.

With this new sound-disco revisit, Kōji redefined himself like he does year after year. Throughout all his career, it could be considered that Kōji had outgrown from an idol to an artiste that explore the music boundary. He writes his own songs, produced and arranged his own albums and also played most of the instruments in it. He had just released a remix album of his old hits-titled-DISCO K2. In April 2007, a new single "BABY JANE" was released.

In 2011, Kōji and Tomoyasu Hotei reunited as Complex for two concerts at the Tokyo Dome to benefit victims of the Tohoku earthquake and tsunami. The duo had not performed together as Complex for almost 21 years. 

He portrays Sokichi Narumi/Kamen Rider Skull for the Kamen Rider W franchise, and sung "Nobody's Perfect," Skull's theme.

Filmography

Film

Television

Music video

References

External links
 Official site 
 

Japanese male film actors
Japanese male television actors
Japanese male pop singers
Japanese male rock singers
Japanese male singer-songwriters
Japanese rock guitarists
1965 births
Living people
Actors from Hiroshima Prefecture
Musicians from Hiroshima Prefecture
20th-century Japanese guitarists
20th-century Japanese male actors
20th-century Japanese male singers
20th-century Japanese singers
21st-century Japanese guitarists
21st-century Japanese male actors
21st-century Japanese male singers
21st-century Japanese singers